Livable Rotterdam is a local political party in the municipality of Rotterdam in the Netherlands, which was founded by Ronald Sørensen in 2001. 

Livable Rotterdam won the council elections of March 2002 due to the charismatic leadership of Pim Fortuyn who had been selected to lead the party. This made it the city's largest political party, a position which for the previous thirty years had been held by the Labour Party. Livable Rotterdam started as a spin-off of the national party Livable Netherlands but is commonly seen as the local party of the LPF (Pim Fortuyn List), the national party of Pim Fortuyn which was founded just after Pim Fortuyn was fired as lijsttrekker of the Livable Netherlands party in spring 2002. Both Livable Rotterdam and the LPF are considered to have similar policy ideas.

The party consists of numerous members that are new to politics and were attracted to Fortuyn's dreams of political change. The party attracts attention and criticism for the upfront behavior of its members and its unconventional, if sometimes right-leaning vision, especially on issues of immigration, crime and inter-culture tolerance.

In the municipal elections of 7 March 2006 Livable Rotterdam lost 5%, dropping to 29,7%  of their votes and PvdA gained 15%, making the latter the biggest party again, with 37,4% of the votes. Before the elections, Livable Rotterdam declared it would not enter in a coalition with PvdA and several members even declared that, irrespective of the coalition, they would leave the council if PvdA would become the biggest party (which has happened).

After the municipal elections of 3 March 2010 the Public Prosecutor in Rotterdam launched an investigation into how proxy votes were solicited by the party, after an e-mail emerged in which one of the party’s councillors gives tips on how to accumulate these. Ronald Buijt wrote that he had 50 reliable citizens of the city who could take the proxy votes to the polling stations. The electoral council said this went against the spirit of proxy voting, which should only be used at the initiative of the voter. This irregularity was added to a litany of complaints against the poll in Rotterdam in these elections (many of which were caused by the PvdA), which resulted in a recount of all the votes cast. Back then the PvdA only beat Livable Rotterdam by a mere 650 votes, yet both parties had 14 seats in the city council.

Joost Eerdmans was elected lijsttrekker of Livable Rotterdam on 6 October 2013. Under his leadership, the party won the 2014 municipal election, retaining its fourteen seats. Since 8 May 2014, Livable Rotterdam leads a coalition with CDA and D66.

As of 2022 the party leads a new coalition with VVD, D66 and Denk

Electoral results

References

External links

  (in Dutch)

Local political parties in the Netherlands
Government of Rotterdam
Nationalist parties in the Netherlands
Anti-Islam sentiment in the Netherlands
Right-wing populism in the Netherlands
Right-wing populist parties
Political parties established in 2001
2001 establishments in the Netherlands